Philip Rousseau (November 3, 1939 – September 3, 2020) was a scholar of early Christianity who held the Andrew W. Mellon Distinguished Professor of Early Christian Studies and was the director of the Center for the Study of Early Christianity at Catholic University of America.

Works

References

Further reading

Historians of Christianity
Catholic University of America School of Theology and Religious Studies faculty
1939 births
2020 deaths
People from Devonport, Plymouth
British emigrants to the United States